Fotbal Club CFR 1933 Timișoara was the women's section of Romanian football club CFR Timișoara. It was created in 2011 and immediately joined the First Division. Part of its squad proceeded from its defunct predecessor FC Ripensia Timișoara, which won the 2009 Cupa României. In its debut season CFR was third in the league's West Division, an overall sixth position.

In September 2018 the club withdrew from Liga I and then was dissolved.

Season by season

References

Defunct football clubs in Romania
Women's football clubs in Romania
Football clubs in Timiș County
Sport in Timișoara
Association football clubs established in 2011
Association football clubs disestablished in 2018
2011 establishments in Romania
2018 disestablishments in Romania